George E. Young Sr. is an American pastor and politician who serves in the Oklahoma Senate from the 48th district as a member of the Democratic Party. Prior to his tenure in the state senate he served in the Oklahoma House of Representatives from the 99th district. He served as vice-chair of the Democratic caucus in the state house and as chair of the Black Caucus in the state legislature.

Early life and education

George E. Young Sr. was born in Memphis, Tennessee. He graduated with a master of business administration and Master of Arts degrees from the Oklahoma Christian University, and graduated from the Phillips Theological Seminary with a master of divinity degree. He worked as the senior pastor at Holy Temple Baptist Church.

Young served as a member of the Oklahoma Commission for Human Services and he criticized Governor Mary Fallin for not appointing a black or Hispanic person to succeed him on the commission. He served as a delegate to the 2008 and 2012 Democratic National Conventions.

Career

Oklahoma House of Representatives

Representative Anastasia Pittman did not seek reelection to the Oklahoma House of Representatives from the 99th district in the 2014 election. He defeated Eleanor Darden Thompson and Steve Davis in the initial Democratic primary, won in the runoff against Thompson, and defeated Republican nominee Willard Linzy in the general election. He won reelection in the 2014 election against independent candidate Marina Mangiaracina. Ajay Pittman was elected to succeed him in the 2018 election.

Young was selected to serve as vice-chair of the Democratic caucus in the state house in 2017, and also served as chair of the Black Caucus of the state legislature.

Oklahoma Senate

Young ran for a seat in the Oklahoma Senate from the 48th district in the 2018 election. He defeated Christine Byrd in the Democratic primary and Republican nominee Linzy in the general election.

Political positions

Young introduced legislation in 2020, to increase Oklahoma's minimum wage from $7.25 per hour to $10.50 per hour.

Electoral history

References

External links
George E. Young's campaign website

21st-century American politicians
African-American state legislators in Oklahoma
Living people
Democratic Party members of the Oklahoma House of Representatives
Oklahoma Christian University alumni
Phillips Theological Seminary people
Year of birth missing (living people)
21st-century African-American politicians